The 1989 Temple Owls football team was an American football team that represented Temple University as an independent during the 1989 NCAA Division I-A football season. In its first season under head coach Jerry Berndt, the team compiled a 1–10 record and was outscored by a total of 387 to 141. The team played its home games at Veterans Stadium in Philadelphia. 

The team's statistical leaders included Victor Lay with 684 passing yards, Ventres Stevenson with 841 rushing yards, Rick Drayton with 383 receiving yards, and placekicker Bob Wright with 43 points scored.

Schedule

References

Temple
Temple Owls football seasons
Temple Owls football